Alfredo Ildefonso Schuster  (born Alfredo Ludovico Schuster; 18 January 1880 – 30 August 1954) was an Italian Roman Catholic prelate and professed member from the Benedictines who served as the Archbishop of Milan from 1929 until his death. He became known as Ildefonso as a Benedictine monk and served as an abbot prior to his elevation to the cardinalate.

He led the Milanese archdiocese during World War II and was known to have supported fascism at first. His views changed to opposition after the annexation of Austria and the introduction of Italian Racial Laws prompting vocal criticisms of anti-Christian aspects of Benito Mussolini's regime.

His beatification was celebrated in mid-1996 in Saint Peter's Square.

Life

Childhood and priesthood
Alfredo Ludovico Schuster was born in 1880 in the Ospedale Santissimo Salvatore in Rome to Johann Schuster (a Bavarian tailor and double widower) and Maria Anna Tutzer (who hailed from Bolzano). Johann was three decades older than Tutzer. His sister Giulia entered the Vincentians as a nun. He also had three half-siblings from his father's second marriage. Schuster was baptized on 20 January as "Alfredo Ludovico Luigi". In his childhood he was kidnapped for a brief period but the kidnapper was arrested.

Schuster received his Confirmation on 2 April 1887 from Monsignor Giulio Lenti and made his First Communion on Pentecost 1890 in the Santa Anna in Porta Angelica church. His father Johann died on 18 September 1889.

He served as an altar server at the Santa Maria della Pietà in Camposanto dei Teutonici church next to Saint Peter's Basilica. Schuster completed his high school studies (ginnasiali and liceali) at the Basilica of Saint Paul Outside the Walls in November 1891. On 13 November 1898 he joined the Order of Saint Benedict at their novitiate at Saint Paul Outside the Walls when he took the name Ildefonso. He later professed his monastic vows on 13 November 1900. He graduated with a Doctor of Philosophy on 14 June 1903 and later received a doctorate in theology from the Pontifical Atheneum of Saint Anselm in Rome.

Schuster received his ordination as a priest on 19 March 1904 at the patriarchal Lateran Basilica in Rome from Cardinal Pietro Respighi (its archpriest). He returned to the Basilica of Saint Paul Outside the Walls in 1904. His two mentors during his time of education were Father Bonifacio Oslander and Tommaso Riccardi.

Abbotship
He became the novice master in 1908 and prior in 1916 before he was elected as the abbot for Saint Paul Outside the Walls on 6 April 1918. He also received the abbatial blessing from Cardinal Basilio Pompili on 14 April there. He served as the Procurator General for the Cassinese Congregation from 1914 to 1929 and also served as the President of the Pontifical Oriental Institute from 1919 to 1922. He visited the seminaries of the northern Lombard region as well as those in the southern regions of Campania and Calabria from 1924 to 1928. Either in November or December 1926 he preached the spiritual exercises to Angelo Giuseppe Roncalli (the future Pope John XXIII) at Saint Paul Outside the Walls. While abbot he was made a consulter to the Congregation for Rites and the Congregation for the Oriental Churches.

Episcopate and cardinalate
Schuster was named Archbishop of Milan on 26 June 1929 to succeed Eugenio Tosi. On the following 13 July he took the oath of allegiance to the Italian state in front of King Vittorio Emanuele III; he was the first Italian bishop to do this since the new Lateran Concordat required it according to Article 20 of the concordat. Pope Pius XI elevated Schuster to the cardinalate in 1929 as the Cardinal-Priest of Santi Silvestro e Martino ai Monti. Carlo Cremonesi and Agostino Zampini served as the co-consecrators. In 1933 he was conferred as a bailiff grand cross of honor and devotion to the Order of Malta.

Schuster ordained 1265 priests and consecrated 22 bishops during his tenure as archbishop. He also made five pastoral visits during his episcopate and selected Saint Carlo Borromeo as his model as an archbishop. He emphasized the importance of catechetics and promoted the Catholic Action movement for the faithful. He also believed that the goal of all Christians was holiness.

He served as a papal legate on several occasions. On 15 August 1932 he was appointed as the legate to the celebration of Nostra Signora di Caravaggio; on 21 March 1934 to the millennial commemorations of the Einsiedeln convent in Switzerland; on 15 September 1937 to the inauguration of the new facade of the cathedral of Desio; and on 2 August 1951 to the National Eucharistic Conference in Assisi.

He participated in the papal conclave in 1939 which elected Pope Pius XII on the eve of World War II and was even considered as a papabile candidate for those seeking a more pastoral pope.

Death

He died on 30 August 1954 at 4:15am of a heart ailment in at Venegono Inferiore near Milan. Cardinal Angelo Giuseppe Roncalli (the future Pope John XXIII) celebrated his funeral. He was buried on 2 September 1954 in the metropolitan cathedral next to his two immediate predecessors. His tomb was opened on 28 January 1985 and his remains were found to be intact.

Honours
  Schuster was honoured with the Order of the Holy Sepulchre
  In 1933 the cardinal was conferred the honour of Bailiff Knight Grand Cross of Honor and Devotion of the Order of Malta.

Relations with fascism
There were claims during the process for Schuster's beatification that he was supportive to Italian fascism. While there is evidence of some support for fascist ambitions, there is also evidence that he denounced the anti-Christian element of fascism. It was said that he refused to participate in ceremonies involving Mussolini and also condemned racist legislation during the fascist period.

Schuster was an enthusiastic supporter of the Italian invasion of Ethiopia in 1935, compared it to the Crusades, and viewed it as a potential source of converts. On 28 October 1935, while celebrating Mass in the Cathedral of Milan, he asked God to protect the Italian troops as "they open the door of Ethiopia to the Catholic faith and Roman civilisation" before he blessed the banners of the departing troops.

In a speech at the School of Fascist Mystique in Rome in 1937, he spelled out a fanciful direct link between Imperial Rome and Christian Rome to fascism: "God has chosen to reward the Duce by drawing his historical figure closer to the great spirits of Constantine and Augustus, through the work of Benito Mussolini reconnecting Rome and its King to a shining new imperial crown of Roman peace."

In 1938, his views changed by Germany annexing Austria and introducing German racial doctrines with the Italian Racial Laws.

Relationship with Mussolini
The Italian fascist and German Nazi press attacked Schuster during the war, without his suffering loss of esteem among his own flock in Milan. On 25 April 1945, the cardinal hosted in the archbishop's palace in Milan a meeting between Italian partisans and Mussolini in an attempt to obtain a truce between the two parties. However, Mussolini did not accept the demand for unconditional surrender that Marazza and Pertini, the partisan delegates, made. Mussolini arrived on time at 4:00pm without the other side being present. The delegates Cadorna and Lombardi as well as Marazza arrived an hour later. Mussolini had a talk with Schuster in the meantime, who gave him a glass of rosolio to drink and a copy of a book he had written about the life of a saint. Schuster made an effort to preach humility to Mussolini. Once Graziani and the other Fascist leaders arrived (according to the versions given according to all those present including Schuster), events that occurred differ according to the individuals versions of events.

Although the cardinal sought Mussolini out on 25 April 1945 and urged him to make his peace with God and his fellow man, Mussolini spurned the admonition and was killed within a week.

Following the end of the war, cardinal made frequent attempts to emphasize the danger of totalitarianism that communism and fascism inspired.

Beatification

The process for his beatification opened in Milan in a diocesan process that his successor inaugurated on 30 August 1957; the process was closed on 31 October 1963 after a process was held in Rome from 21 November 1959 to 13 July 1961 to collect additional evidence and documentation. His writings were approved on 5 March 1970 as having adhered to traditional doctrine. The cause remained dormant for some time until 18 July 1986 when the Congregation for the Causes of Saints validated the diocesan phase while later receiving the Positio for assessment in 1989. Theologians approved the cause on 12 October 1993 as did the C.C.S. members later on 11 January 1994. Pope John Paul II confirmed that Schuster had led a life of heroic virtue and named him as Venerable on 26 March 1994.

Schuster's beatification now depended upon one confirmed miracle. One such case was investigated with the evidence collected sent to Rome with the C.C.S. validating this process on 5 July 1985. Medical experts confirmed this miracle as such a decade later on 17 November 1994 while theologians confirmed the assessment on 21 February 1995; the C.C.S. also approved it on 2 May 1995. John Paul II confirmed that the healing in question was a miracle on 11 July 1995 and confirmed Schuster's beatification. The beatification was celebrated on 12 May 1996 in Saint Peter's Square.

The miracle that led to his beatification was the cure of the nun Maria Emilia Brusati from a severe glaucoma.

See also
 Cardinal electors for the papal conclave, 1939
 Incorruptibility
 List of beatified people

References

Sources

 
 
 
 
 
 Leccisotti, T. (1969), Il cardinale Schuster, S. Benedetto, Milan. 
 Nobili, E. (2005), La parabola di un'illusione. Il cardinale Schuster dalla guerra d'Etiopia alle leggi razziali, NED, Milan.

External links
 Hagiography Circle
 Saint Kateri Parish
 Catholic Hierarchy
 Catholic Online
 
 Video of the Blessed Ildefonso Schuster’s Episcopal Enthonement
 Modern Reprint of "The Sacramentary" (Liber Sacramentorum) in Five Volumes]

1880 births
1954 deaths
20th-century Italian cardinals
19th-century venerated Christians
20th-century Italian Roman Catholic archbishops
20th-century venerated Christians
Abbots of Farfa
Archbishops of Milan
Beatifications by Pope John Paul II
Benedictine beatified people
Benedictine bishops
Benedictine cardinals
Burials at Milan Cathedral
Clergy from Rome
Incorrupt saints
Italian anti-fascists
Italian beatified people
Italian Benedictines
Italian people of German descent
Members of the Order of the Holy Sepulchre
Pontifical Atheneum of St. Anselm alumni
Venerated Catholics by Pope John Paul II